The following is a list of Singaporean electoral divisions from 1991 to 1997 that served as constituencies that elected Members of Parliament (MPs) to the 8th Parliament of Singapore in the 1991 Singaporean general elections. The total number of seats in Parliament remains unchanged since the last general election.

The number of opposition candidates in Parliament have increased to 4. There are 3 from the Singapore Democratic Party and 1 from the Worker's Party.

Group Representation Constituencies

Single Member Constituencies

References

External links 
 

1991